
This is a list of bridges documented by the Historic American Engineering Record in the US state of Arizona.

Bridges

References

List
List
Arizona
Bridges, HAER
Bridges, HAER